Donetta Wypiski Ambrose (born November 5, 1945) is a senior United States district judge of the United States District Court for the Western District of Pennsylvania.

Education and career

Born in New Kensington, Pennsylvania, Ambrose received a Bachelor of Arts degree from Duquesne University in 1967 and a Juris Doctor from Duquesne University School of Law in 1970. She was a law clerk to Louis Manderino of Commonwealth Court of Pennsylvania from 1970 to 1971. She was an assistant attorney general of Pennsylvania Department of Justice from 1972 to 1974, thereafter entering private practice in New Kensington until 1981. She was an assistant district attorney in the Westmoreland County District Attorney's Office from 1977 to 1981. She was a judge of the Westmoreland County Court of Common Pleas from 1982 to 1993.

Federal judicial service

On October 25, 1993, Ambrose was nominated by President Bill Clinton to a seat on the United States District Court for the Western District of Pennsylvania vacated by Gerald Joseph Weber. She was confirmed by the United States Senate on November 20, 1993, and received her commission on November 24, 1993. Upon the elevation of D. Brooks Smith to the United States Court of Appeals for the Third Circuit, Judge Ambrose became Chief Judge for the U.S. District Court for the Western District of Pennsylvania, and served in that capacity until 2009. She assumed senior status on November 5, 2010.

References
  

1945 births
Living people
Judges of the Pennsylvania Courts of Common Pleas
Judges of the United States District Court for the Western District of Pennsylvania
United States district court judges appointed by Bill Clinton
Duquesne University alumni
Duquesne University School of Law alumni
People from New Kensington, Pennsylvania
20th-century American judges
21st-century American judges
20th-century American women judges
21st-century American women judges